The Criminal Appeal Reports (Sentencing), sometimes referred to as the Criminal Appeal (Sentencing) Reports, are a series of law reports of decisions which relate to sentencing.

They are published by Sweet & Maxwell. Publication began in 1979.
As of 2008, they were published six times each year.

For the purpose of citation, their name may be abbreviated to "Cr App R (S)".

See also
Criminal Appeal Reports

References

External links
"Criminal Appeal Reports (Sentencing)". Cardiff Index to Legal Abbreviations. Cardiff University.

Case law reporters of the United Kingdom